An All-American team is an honorary sports team composed of the best amateur players of a specific season for each team position—who in turn are given the honorific "All-America" and typically referred to as "All-American athletes", or simply "All-Americans".  Although the honorees generally do not compete together as a unit, the term is used in U.S. team sports to refer to players who are selected by members of the national media.  Walter Camp selected the first All-America team in the early days of American football in 1889.  The 2011 NCAA Men's Basketball All-Americans are honorary lists that include All-American selections from the Associated Press (AP), the United States Basketball Writers Association (USBWA), the Sporting News (TSN), and the National Association of Basketball Coaches (NABC) for the 2010–11 NCAA Division I men's basketball season.  All selectors choose at least a first and second 5-man team. The NABC, TSN and AP choose third teams, while AP also lists honorable mention selections.

The Consensus 2011 College Basketball All-American team is determined by aggregating the results of the four major All-American teams as determined by the National Collegiate Athletic Association (NCAA).  Since United Press International was replaced by TSN in 1997, the four major selectors have been the aforementioned ones.  AP has been a selector since 1948, NABC since 1957 and USBWA since 1960.  To earn "consensus" status, a player must win honors based on a point system computed from the four different all-America teams. The point system consists of three points for first team, two points for second team and one point for third team. No honorable mention or fourth team or lower are used in the computation.  The top five totals plus ties are first team and the next five plus ties are second team.

Although the aforementioned lists are used to determine consensus honors, there are numerous other All-American lists.  The ten finalists for the John Wooden Award are described as Wooden All-Americans.  The ten finalists for the Lowe's Senior CLASS Award are described as Senior All-Americans.  Other All-American lists include those determined by Fox Sports, and Yahoo! Sports.  The scholar-athletes selected by College Sports Information Directors of America (CoSIDA) are termed Academic All-Americans.

2011 Consensus All-America team
The following players are recognized as the 2011 Consensus All-Americans:
PG – Point guard
SG – Shooting guard
PF – Power forward
SF – Small forward
C – Center

Individual All-America teams

By player

By team

AP Honorable Mention:

Harrison Barnes, North Carolina
Talor Battle, Penn State
Devon Beitzel, Northern Colorado
Keith Benson, Oakland
Solomon Bozeman, Arkansas-Little Rock
Alec Burks, Colorado
Gilberto Clavell, Sam Houston State
Norris Cole, Cleveland State
Malcolm Delaney, Virginia Tech
Austin Freeman, Georgetown
Ashton Gibbs, Pittsburgh
Andrew Goudelock, College of Charleston
Justin Greene, Kent State
Dwight Hardy, St. John's
John Holland, Boston University
Ken Horton, Central Connecticut State
Reggie Jackson, Boston College
Rick Jackson, Syracuse
Charles Jenkins, Hofstra
John Jenkins, Vanderbilt
Aaron Johnson, UAB
Terrence Jones, Kentucky
Travele Jones, Texas Southern
Brandon Knight, Kentucky
Jon Leuer, Wisconsin
Mickey McConnell, Saint Mary's
E'Twaun Moore, Purdue
Markieff Morris, Kansas
Mike Muscala, Bucknell
Chandler Parsons, Florida
C. J. Reed, Bethune-Cookman
Ryan Rossiter, Siena
Jesse Sanders, Liberty
Kyle Singler, Duke
Mike Smith, East Tennessee State
Isaiah Thomas, Washington
Tristan Thompson, Texas
Nikola Vucevic, Southern California
Brad Wanamaker, Pittsburgh
Casper Ware, Long Beach State
Kyle Weems, Missouri State
Tai Wesley, Utah State
Jordan Williams, Maryland
Isiah Williams, Utah Valley
Keith Wright, Harvard

Academic All-Americans
On February 22, 2011, CoSIDA and ESPN The Magazine announced the 2011 Academic All-America team, with Matt Howard headlining the University Division as the men's college basketball Academic All-American of the Year.  The following is the 2010–11 ESPN The Magazine Academic All-America Men's Basketball Team (University Division) as selected by CoSIDA:

Senior All-Americans
The ten finalists for the Lowe's Senior CLASS Award are called Senior All-Americans.  The 10 honorees are as follows:

References

All-Americans
NCAA Men's Basketball All-Americans